Santurce can refer to:

Santurce (Basque: Santurtzi), a town near Bilbao, the Basque Country, Spain; the original town with the name
Santurce, Argentina, a town in Santa Fe, Argentina.
Santurce, San Juan, Puerto Rico, a barrio of the municipio of San Juan, Puerto Rico